Massachusetts House of Representatives' 14th Worcester district in the United States is one of 160 legislative districts included in the lower house of the Massachusetts General Court. It covers part of Worcester County. Democrat Jim O'Day of West Boylston has represented the district since 2007.

Locales represented
The district includes the following localities:
 West Boylston
 part of the city of Worcester

The current district geographic boundary overlaps with that of the Massachusetts Senate's 1st Worcester district.

Former locales
The district previously covered:
 Northbridge, circa 1872 
 Upton, circa 1872

Representatives
 James E. Cheney, circa 1858 
 Ralph E. Bigelow, circa 1859 
 Morrill A. Greenwood, circa 1888 
 Albert T. Wall, circa 1920 
 Gerald P. Lombard, circa 1951-1975 
 James B. Leary
 James J. O'Day, 2007-current

See also
 List of Massachusetts House of Representatives elections
 Other Worcester County districts of the Massachusetts House of Representatives: 1st, 2nd, 3rd, 4th, 5th, 6th, 7th, 8th, 9th, 10th, 11th, 12th, 13th, 15th, 16th, 17th, 18th
 Worcester County districts of the Massachusett Senate: 1st, 2nd; Hampshire, Franklin and Worcester; Middlesex and Worcester; Worcester, Hampden, Hampshire and Middlesex; Worcester and Middlesex; Worcester and Norfolk
 List of Massachusetts General Courts
 List of former districts of the Massachusetts House of Representatives

Images
Portraits of legislators

References

External links
 Ballotpedia
  (State House district information based on U.S. Census Bureau's American Community Survey).
 League of Women Voters of the Worcester Area

House
Government in Worcester County, Massachusetts